Burhaniye is a station on the Istanbul Metrobus Bus rapid transit line. It is located on the Istanbul Inner Beltway and accessible via Burhaniye Abdullahağa Avenue. The station is serviced by four of the seven Metrobus routes.

Burhaniye station was opened on 3 March 2009 as part of the eastward expansion of the line across the Bosporus.

References

External links
Burhaniye station

Istanbul Metrobus stations
Üsküdar